The Usway Burn is an upland river on the southern flanks of the Cheviot Hills, in the Northumberland National Park, England.

It is a tributary of the River Coquet and is about 15 km in length. It is located close to the northernmost end of the Pennine Way.

Course
The Usway Burn has several tributaries and inlets, including some in the hills far to the north.

Cairn Hill, a 777m subsidiary of The Cheviot, is drained by both Coldwell Strand and Shedding Sike, the Usway Burn's northernmost tributaries.

Further south, the longer Davidson's Burn and Tod Sike join the Usway Burn from the western side, with sources very close to Scotland. Davidson's Linn waterfall was praised by the 20th-century travel writers F.R. Banks and Dippie Dixon.

The Clay Burn is an eastern tributary, which drains from streams on the edge of Bloodybush Edge hill (610m).

Uswayford is the northernmost settlement on the Usway Burn, by the hill Hazely Law (499m). Uswayford contains a farm and former quarry site. Previously there was a bed and breakfast at Uswayford, but as of 2013 this was no longer available.

Downriver in the less forested areas, Usway Burn and Hepden Burn (to the west) pass close to each other, running parallel for a few miles. Hepden Burn meets the River Coquet.

The Usway Burn runs south past the Fairhaugh House & Estate, and Batailshiel Haugh Farm between Saughy Hill and Shillhope Law (both approx. 500m high). About two miles further south is Shillmoor, where the Usway Burn meets its confluence with the River Coquet.

See also
 River Coquet
 River Alwin
 List of rivers of England

References

External links

 Ordnance Survey map of the Usway Burn - Streetmap.co.uk
 The Usway Burn & a figure of eight - CheviotWalks.org
 "The Definitive Guide to Northumberland Waterfalls" including information about the Usway Burn - ThisIsNorthumberland.com

Rivers of Northumberland